Guénégoré  is a village and rural commune in the Cercle of Kéniéba in the Kayes Region of south-western Mali. It is located near the border with Guinea. The commune includes 7 villages and in the 2009 census had a population of 7,229.

References

External links
.

Communes of Kayes Region